is a music composer, arranger and member of the Japanese Society for Rights of Authors, Composers and Publishers (JASRAC). He graduated from the Department of Literature at Chuo University and afterwards Nippon Columbia joined as music director. He currently works as a music producer, arranger and singer.

Contributions
Arakawa has composed music for anime:
Crayon Shin-chan
Cyborg Kuro-chan
Shōnen Ashibe
He has composed music for all the 23 Crayon Shinchan movies (as of 2015).

References

External links 
 

1953 births
Chuo University alumni
Japanese film score composers
Japanese male film score composers
Living people